The Kasson Public School building is located at 101 Third Avenue NW in city of Kasson, Dodge County, Minnesota, in the United States.  Designed by architect Nels S. Jacobson Jr. of the architectural firm Jacobson & Jacobson, the school was constructed during the years 1917–1918.  Kasson's elementary and high school students began using the building on December 5, 1918.

History

Summary

The Kasson Public School was constructed during the years 1917–1918.  Kasson's elementary and high school students began using the building on December 5, 1918. Samuel A. Challman, the first State Commissioner of Minnesota School Buildings and the foremost standard-bearer for the construction of Minnesota schools, expressed his approval of the school during a 1919 visit:

"Mr. S.A. Challman, state inspector of school buildings, made the Kasson School a visit on Wednesday last and went into ecstasies over the structure erected here the past year.  He says there is nothing equal to it in the state in the way of completeness and architectural design.  He wanted a photo of it so that he could use it upon his letterheads.  He stated that it was the first of its type - three separate units, connected with a corridor, to be built in the state, but said it would be an ideal pattern for others who could not resist the temptation when once they saw this model structure."

Commissioner Challman made the following statement about schoolhouse construction in 1914 to the National Education Association of the United States:

"We must not forget that our public-school buildings leave an indelible impress upon the minds of the children who attend them.  Their very appearance is an education in itself, with which each community and the nation at large must reckon.  We speak rightly of school architecture and must not forget that architecture is one of the fine arts.  We have no more right to violate the established principles of architecture than we have to violate the principles of hygiene or pedagogy.  Our duty is to harmonize the various factors which enter into the problem and out of the whole produce a result which shall embody all that is true with respect to hygiene, mental growth, and aesthetic values."

The school was used continuously from 1918 into 2005.  For nearly ninety years the Kasson Public School played a central role in the life of the community.  It served as Kasson's only school building until 1958 when the school district merged with nearby Mantorville and combined high school classes were held at a new school north of town.  It served as the Kasson Elementary School for more than four decades after that. It eventually housed an alternative school, community education and school district administrative functions.  Those uses were discontinued in 2005.  The 1895 Kasson Water Tower, which is on the National Register of Historic Places, is located behind the school.

In early 2006 the City of Kasson, MN obtained the school.   A November 2006 referendum to reuse the school as a combination city hall, police station and other governmental uses missed approval by only 122 votes.  The city council soon voted to demolish the building.

In response, local citizens formed the non-profit Kasson Alliance for Restoration (KARE) in January 2007 to advocate for saving the school.  In May/June 2007 KARE stopped the demolition by filing a lawsuit against the city.  KARE then sponsored an effort which lead to the Kasson Public School being placed on the National Register of Historic Places on December 6, 2007.  The suit was settled out of court in August 2008.

As part of the settlement the city and KARE partnered to conduct an Historic Properties Reuse Study which was completed in October 2009 by John Lauber and Company.  The reuse study suggested many reuses for the school to include for example apartments, library and a community center.  The study instructed the city to: “Market the [school] building to potential development partners (page 4)”.  In the fall of 2009, the city formed a Citizen's Task Force (CTF)to explore the reuse options.

In April 2010 The CTF polled Kasson's citizens and discovered that a majority of them favored reusing the school.  In June 2010 the city offered KARE part ownership in the school provided KARE raised $3.9 million by August 31, 2011.  KARE declined this offer.  In September 2010 the city formed the Kasson Public Library Building Committee (KPLBC) to explore reusing the school site as a library.

In August 2011 the KPLBC presented a $4.5 million 20,000 square foot library building plan to the city that called for first demolishing the 1918 School.  The city council expressed concern about the cost.  In the months preceding November 2011 numerous citizens met personally with council members, attended council meetings and wrote letters to the editor all supporting reusing the school.  On November 1, 2011, the city placed the school on the market for $400,000 in an effort to attract developers.  Numerous developers attended an open house at the school on November 30, 2011.  On December 14, 2011, the City of Kasson received an offer from the developer Sherman Associates of Minneapolis, MN (http://www.sherman-associates.com/) regarding their interest in purchasing the Historic 1918 Kasson School. On December 21, 2011, the city council voted to sign a Letter of Intent with Sherman Associates.  A senior housing complex is proposed for the school.

2005-2006: City of Kasson Obtains the School
The school building's future first emerged as an issue in 2005 when the Kasson-Mantorville School District moved the few programs remaining in the building to the district's expansive campus north of town.  Seeing an opportunity to meet its needs for additional space, and also to achieve a stated objective of “develop[ing] or redevelop[ing] the elementary school site to benefit the community and enhance the surrounding neighborhood if [the school district] discontinue[d] use for educational purposes,” the city retained Kane and Johnson Architects of Rochester to complete a Space Needs Study.   The study, among other things, investigated the potential for reusing the school building or site to help meet the city's long- and short-term facilities needs.  As part of this study, Kane and Johnson prepared concept drawings and rough cost estimates showing how the 1918 school building could be converted into a multi-use public building housing city offices, the public library, and space for community gatherings. The Space Needs Study report recommended renonovating the school and stated that preserving the building would be more cost effective the building new. The estimated cost of the project was $3.9 million. With this information in hand the city acquired the 1918 building and site in early 2006 from the school district forgiving approximately $320,000 worth of assessments for infrastructure improvements at the expanding north school campus in exchange for the property.

November 2006 Referendum & First Vote to Demolish

In November 2006, the Kane and Johnson conceptual plan was submitted to local citizens in the form of a referendum.  An earlier ballot proposed for a July 2009 special election was deemed illegal by the Minnesota Attorney General's office.  In the November election, voters were asked to decide if the city of Kasson should “be authorized to issue its general obligation bonds in an amount not to exceed $3,900,000 to defray the expense of the renovation, expansion and equipping of the former elementary school for city hall, library, or other governmental purposes.” The referendum failed by a narrow vote of 894 to 1,026.  Despite the close vote and no clear mandate, a few weeks later the Kasson city council voted to demolish the building without further consultation with citizens.

2007: Kasson Alliance Formed & Demolition Stopped

In January 2007, a group of preservation-minded advocates from Kasson formed the Kasson Alliance for Restoration (KARE). KARE was formed as a non-profit organization dedicated to finding a way to rehabilitate rather than demolish the building as well as furthering historic preservation within Kasson. In light of the statistically tied vote from November 2006, KARE members lobbied unsuccessfully at numerous council meetings in April 2007 for the city council to reverse its demolition decision and further consult with citizens on the future of the school building to include using Kane and Johnson's expertise.  The council chose to move ahead and announced they would open demolition bids in May.  As a result, KARE sued the city under provisions of the Minnesota Environmental Rights Act (MERA, which protects historic resources) in an effort to halt the demolition.  The lawsuit was filed on the eve of the city opening demolition bids on May 23, 2007.  After a hearing in June at which KARE's attorney and the Cities' legal representative from the League of Minnesota Cities presented their cases, the Dodge County Court issued a temporary injunction in June 2007 prohibiting demolition and a trial was set for February 2008. KARE proceeded to have the school listed on the National Register of Historic Places which occurred in December 2007.

2008 Out-of-Court Settlement

More than a year of litigation followed during which the trial was postponed to August 2008 to give the two sides more time to negotiate.  In an effort to settle the lawsuit out of court and resolve the school issue, the city of Kasson and KARE, agreed in August 2008 to settle out of court and co-sponsor a Historic Properties Reuse Study of the 1918 Kasson School.  The city issued a request for proposals (RFP) for the project in December 2008 and a contract for the project was awarded to a team assembled by John Lauber and Company of Minneapolis in the spring of 2009 (ironically, Kane and Johnson also bid on it).  The RFP stated that the purpose of the study was “to define and evaluate reuse options regarding the 1918-era Kasson Elementary School and/or its site.”

2009 Historic Properties Reuse Study

The Reuse Study was jointly sponsored and funded primarily by the City of Kasson and the Kasson Alliance for Restoration (KARE). The study, which cost $30,000, was also funded in part by a grant to KARE for $2,500 from the National Trust for Historic Preservation and the Preservation Alliance of Minnesota (a SWEATT Grant).   The reuse study was completed in collaboration with a School Reuse Action Committee (SCHRAC) which KARE formed.  SCHRAC was a nineteen-member advisory committee of area citizens, city officials, and technical experts formed to assist the Lauber Team with the effort.  The Lauber Team visited Kasson and toured the school in the spring of 2009.  In June 2009, the team conducted extensive interviews with Kasson's citizens and conducted a community workshop followed by additional visits to Kasson later in the summer.  A draft reuse study report was issued in September 2009 and the final report was published in October and presented to the City Council.  The October 2009 Historic Properties Reuse Study Report and additional information can be viewed at: http://kassonschoolreuse.net/ or the Kasson Alliances' website at http://www.kassonalliance.org/ .  The City of Kasson subsequently appointed a Citizen Task Force in November 2009 to investigate options for reusing the school.

June 2010 Partnership Offer

On June 9, 2010, the City of Kasson passed a resolution and proposal that offered the Kasson Alliance for Restoration (KARE) a 49% share in owning and maintaining the building provided KARE secured $3.9 million by August 31, 2011, whereupon the city would present a November 2011 referendum for $3.9 million ($7.8 mil total).  The resolution, which was threatening in nature, stated that any reuse identified for the building needed to include a library component. KARE responded politely to the proposal in a letter dated June 21 stating in summary: a) it was not within KARE's advocacy mission to own and maintain buildings and b) the required planning and coordination with the library board (a huge problem in past efforts) had not yet been done to fully formulate the reuse plan for the building.   KARE stated that no one would sign the proposed agreement/partnership (with a very short time frame) given that the reuse plan was still in its infancy and had not been adopted by the building's owner (the city) or the library board.  The city council subsequently reminded the library board that the cities' designated site for a new, larger library is the historic school site.

2010: Kasson Public Library Building Committee Formed

Previous space needs studies in Kasson had shown that the city could benefit from a larger library which was housed in a 2,294 square foot building.  The 2009 Reuse Study identified an expanded library as a leading candidate for reusing the 1918 School.  So, on August 4, 2010, KARE board members and volunteers attended the library board meeting to voice KARE's support for the libraries' quest for a larger facility and to answer questions about KARE's mission and the potential to reuse the school as a library.  On parallel path, at the council meeting on August 25, Mayor Tim Tjosaas asked the council to form a Kasson Public Library Building Committee (KPLBC) composed of citizen volunteers and non-voting public officials which was approved.  The KPLBC began meeting in September 2010 followed by a tour of local libraries and a tour of the historic Kasson Public School.

2011: Kasson Public Library Building Committee Presents A Plan

The KPLBC continued to meet in 2011.  In February 2011 the KPLBC announced that they had met with Deb Parrott of the engineering and architecture firm Widseth, Smith, Nolting and Associates.  Ms. Parrott, who has experience with library design, was asked to prepare three library design proposals for the historic school as follows: Option 1) total rehabilitation of the 1918 school building, Option 2) a partial or modified rehabilitation of the school building and Option 3) a completely new structure on the general footprint of the existing building [note: after demolition of the 1918 school].

On August 10, 2011, the KPLBC presented the aforementioned Option 3 to the city council. That option proposed replacing the historic 1918 school with a $4.5 million 20,000 square foot library facility which included 3,000 sq. ft. of community meeting space.  The plan would have been implemented after demolishing the historic school.  The council did not vote to demolish the school however they did vote to have the KPLBC continue with their planning effort.   The chambers were full of school supporters.  Council member Mike Marti expressed concern about the cost.  Letters to the editor soon started appearing supporting the reuse of the school building.  On August 12, the Rochester Post Bulletin editorial board stated (quoting): “don’t demolish the school until a firm decision has been made-and funding obtained for whatever structure will replace it”.

August 2011 Environmental Assessment Worksheet (EAW)

In a move that implied that the city was contemplating demolition, on Wednesday August 24 the Kasson City Council selected a bid to conduct an Environmental Assessment Worksheet (EAW) on the historic 1918 Kasson School. An assessment worksheet is required by MN state law for any National Register Listed building prior to it being demolished. The Minnesota Historical Society, Preservation Alliance of Minnesota and all citizens can comment on the EAW. An organization called Pathfinders CRM (Robert Vogel) in partnership with the AE firm Widseth, Smith and Nolting were awarded the bid. The City Council has not voted to demolish the school but the EAW process is a step in that direction. In the meantime, Kasson's citizens are meeting with council members to discuss alternatives to demolition. Robert Vogel (from Pathfinders CRM, LLC) was selected to work on the EAW in partnership with the Architect and Engineering firm Widseth, Smith and Nolting. At this point the EAW was required by Minnesota's Environmental Resources Act (MERA) due to KARE successfully placing the school on the National Register of Historic Places (NRHP) in December 2007.

November 2011: Environmental Assessment Worksheet Published and Reviewed
In the months preceding November 2011 numerous citizens met personally with council members, attended council meetings and wrote letters to the editor all supporting reusing the school. On November 1, 2011, the city listed the 1918 school for sale thru Kathy O’Malley of Counselor Realty of Rochester, MN. On November 28, 2011, the Minnesota Environmental Quality Board (EQB) announced in their newsletter that the EAW for the historic Kasson School was available for review. The city was selected by the EQB to be the Responsible Government Unit (RGU) with sole review authority over the EAW. The EAW comments were due to City Planner Mike Martin 30 days later on December 28, 2011.
On November 30, 2011, an open house was held at the school which was preceded by a presentation on the advantages of historic preservation by Bonnie McDonald, executive director of the Preservation Alliance of Minnesota. Numerous developers attended and were clearly interesting in developing the school

December 2011: Sherman and Associates' Offer to Purchase the School, EAW Comments Due
On December 14, 2011, the City of Kasson received an offer from the developer Sherman Associates of Minneapolis, MN (http://www.sherman-associates.com/) regarding their interest in purchasing the Historic 1918 Kasson School. On December 21, 2011, the city council voted to sign a Letter of Intent with Sherman Associates. A senior housing complex was proposed for the school. In the meantime the EAW review process was ongoing with comments due December 28. Comments were provided by the following entities: a) Preservation Alliance of Minnesota, b) State Historic Preservation Office (SHPO), Minnesota Historical Society, c) Minnesota Department of Transportation (required) and d) and many private citizens. At the city council meeting on January 25, 2102, the city determined that an EIS was not needed and that Minnesota law did not require them to modify the EAW as requested in the review comments.

October - November 2012: Sherman and Associates Requests Local Investment
On October 25, 2012 Paul Keenan, Project Manager, Sherman and Associates contacted the realtor Kathy O'Malley stating:
"I regret to say we were not awarded income-based housing tax credits today by the Minnesota Housing and Finance Agency [which facilitates the distribution of federal housing funds].  We lost out to 3 projects with subsidized rents (Section 8) and another project that committed 25% of its units to homeless applicants which would not have been a good fit for Kasson.  These types of projects had a scoring advantage over our project.  I am going to wait a few days to see how everything shakes out and see if we have any other options for funding.  I will keep you posted."  The Kasson team explored various options with Paul and the builder Joe Weiss.  On Nov 13, Paul wrote:  "I have reviewed the construction pricing with Weiss and we think we can cut $250K from the budget possibly.  That leaves the gap at $1.5 million.  In terms of a local contribution that has been discussed, where do you think those funds would come from?"  No one stepped forward to lead the effort to raise the funds thus Sherman and Associates cancelled their purchase agreement.

2013: City of Kasson, Second Vote to Demolish
The city council voted again to demolish the school.  Citizens again stepped forward suing the city.  The city relented and offered to sell the school for $240,000.  The 1918 Kasson Public School Limited Liability Limited Partnership (LLLP) was formed.  $92,000 was raised by selling shares at $500.00 per share to investors.  The balance was donated by Kasson resident Jon Tollefson.  The school was purchased by the LLLP.  The Kasson Alliance for Restoration (KARE) was appointed as the LLLP's General Partner.

2013 - October 2015: Cohen-Esrey's Purchase Agreement
Tom Anderson, Project Manager, Cohen-Esrey expressed interest in reusing the 1918 school as Section 42 affordable housing apartments.  The Cohen-Esrey "family of companies" has developed thousands of apartments over at least two decades. Since 1994, Cohen-Esrey Affordable Partners LLC has used housing and historic tax credits to create over 4,000 units of affordable housing for seniors and families. Cohen-Esrey Communities LLC has managed about 500 apartment complexes in about 175 cities, with more 60,000 apartments.

Cohen-Esrey signed a purchase agreement and requested permits and a variance.  On May 11, 2015 the Kasson Planning and Zoning Commission in a 6–1 vote recommended that the city council approve a conditional use permit (CUP) for the school property to allow multifamily housing on the site.  The commission also recommended that the city council approve a variance to allow less than 50 percent green space on the property.  The general consensus was that the project, which would remove some paved areas, increased permeability over the existing condition. The room was packed with people.  Tom Anderson from Cohen-Esrey made a presentation.    Before voting, the commission debated how to strike a balance with the citizens and neighbors of the building who opposed the project and those supporting the school's reuse.  Neighbors who opposed the project stated the density of 24 multi-family units was too large for the single family residential neighborhood.  Concerns about additional traffic and other issues were also discussed.  However, Minnesota law states that a CUP cannot be denied based on citizen input if the CUP application meets the requirements listed in the city code.  In the end the Commission decided that the CUP application met the approval requirements listed in the cities' code and the variance was approved allowing the installation of impermeable surface over 60% of the property.    The Planning Commission put the following conditions on the CUP:
1. The Developer must install a combination fence and natural screening border acceptable to t the Zoning Administrator prior to the issuance of a Certificate of Occupancy
2. The Developer must provide at least one outdoor, on-site smoking area acceptable to the Zoning Administrator prior to the issuance of a Certificate of Occupancy.
3. The Developer must provide an ingress/egress plan acceptable to the Zoning Administrator prior to the issuance of a Certificate of Occupancy.

On May 13, 2015 the city council subsequently voted to approve the CUP.  A motion to approve the Conditional Use Permit for Cohen-Esrey was made by Borgstrom, second by Buck with Buck, Borgstrom and Johnson voting Aye. Coleman and Eggler voted Nay. The CUP vote passed 3–2.  A motion to approve the variance request for Cohen-Esrey was made by Coleman, seconded by Borgstrom with Buck, Borgstrom, Coleman, Eggler and Johnson voting Aye. The vote passed 5–0.

In October 2015 Tom Anderson reported, similar to Sherman and Associates, the project was not awarded income-based housing tax credits from the Minnesota Housing and Finance Agency [which facilitates the distribution of federal housing funds]. Cohen-Esrey cancelled their purchase agreement.

2022: Kasson Historic Properties LLC, Lawsuit, State Tax Credits Expire
In July 2022, Paul Warshauer, registered Kasson Historic Properties, (KHP) LLC with the State of Minnesota and signed a purchase agreement for the school.  KHP LLC is an umbrella organization to reuse the school as senior housing.  The project was titled "Water Tower Place" as a nod to the 1895 water tower which resides in the northwest corner for the school's playground.  It was determined approximately $4,000,000 was needed in local investment and additional funding for the project to be viable; a reminder of Sherman and Associates' shortfall.  In 2022 various hurdles, including a lawsuit from an unsuccessful bidder and the State of Minnesota's historic tax credit program expiring, prevented the project from moving forward.

2023: Kasson Historic Properties LLC, Second Attempt
In 2022 the purchase agreement was extended to allow time for options to be explored.

Notes

Buildings and structures in Dodge County, Minnesota
Defunct schools in Minnesota
School buildings completed in 1918
School buildings on the National Register of Historic Places in Minnesota
National Register of Historic Places in Dodge County, Minnesota
1918 establishments in Minnesota